Albert William "Tim" Trevaskis (23 August 1902 – 2 July 1980) was an Australian rules footballer who played for North Melbourne in both the Victorian Football Association (VFA), and the Victorian Football League (VFL).

Family
The son of George William Trevaskis (1872-1952), and Rosetta Trevaskis (1875-1946), née Jordan, Albert William Trevaskis was born on 23 August 1902.

He married Alicia Florence Cruickshank (1904-1984) in 1923.

Football

North Melbourne (VFA)
Trevaskis played with North Melbourne in the Victorian Football Association (VFA) in the 1921, 1923, and 1924 seasons.

North Melbourne (VFL)
In 1925 he was a member of their inaugural VFL team and was a regular member of the team for five years, playing mostly as a rover and at half forward.

He was captain of the team in 1929.

Interstate VFL
He represented the VFL in the interstate match against New South Wales, that was played in Sydney on 8 June 1929.<ref>[https://trove.nla.gov.au/newspaper/article/136206650/15586504 'Left Wing, "Australian Football: Victoria Wins Narrowly", The Referee, (Wednesday, 12 June 1929) p. 13.]</ref>

Coburg (VFA)
He briefly captain-coached Coburg in 1930.

North Melbourne Reserves (VFL)
He was later in charge of North Melbourne's reserves team.

Footnotes

References
Holmesby, Russell and Main, Jim (2007). The Encyclopedia of AFL Footballers''. 7th ed. Melbourne: Bas Publishing.

External links

 
 Albert "Tim" Trevaskis: The VFA Project.
 Tim Trevaskis: ''Boyles Football Photos.

1902 births
1980 deaths
North Melbourne Football Club players
North Melbourne Football Club (VFA) players
Coburg Football Club players
Coburg Football Club coaches
Australian rules footballers from Melbourne
People from West Melbourne, Victoria